Bárbara Gatica and Rebeca Pereira were the defending champions but Gatica had been provisionally suspended for doping since June 2022, whilst Pereira chose not to participate.

Alicia Barnett and Olivia Nicholls won the title, defeating Vivian Heisen and Katarzyna Kawa in the final, 6–1, 7–6(7–3).

Seeds

Draw

Draw

References

External Links
Main Draw

Polish Open - Doubles